Awareness Sunday takes place each year on a Sunday in September. Awareness Sunday in 2014 took place on Sunday 14 September. Awareness Sunday is described as "about healing and reconciliation in our communities". Awareness Sunday is an initiative of the Awareness Foundation. "Awareness Sunday is an annual opportunity to reflect on the value of loving our neighbour as ourself, even if our neighbour is of a different religious faith or worldview." According to the Awareness Sunday website, "This is an invitation to everyone, whatever their faith or world view, to join us at this time and make a commitment to change attitudes and build relationships in your own community, based on respect and understanding."

Supporters 
Awareness Sunday is supported by the Archbishop of Canterbury, the Archbishop of York, Archbishop Desmond Tutu, and many other leading clergy in the Church of England, the Roman Catholic Church, the Methodist Church and the Baptist Church. In addition, Awareness Sunday is supported by Lord Sacks, the former Chief Rabbi for the United Kingdom and Commonwealth, and Sunni and Shia scholars.

Main events in 2011 
A special public service of remembrance and reconciliation for Awareness Sunday took place at Westminster Abbey in London at 6:30 pm on Sunday 11 September 2011. The Abbey was packed with people from around the world: Londoners and tourists, plus priests, imams and rabbis. A large number of those attending were American. Other events took place across the UK, and internationally. Nadim Nassar, Director of the Awareness Foundation, preached, and Courtney Cowart, a survivor of 9/11, spoke about her experiences. Cowart laid a wreath at the Memorial to Innocent Victims during the service.

In addition, the Sunday Worship on BBC Radio 4 at 8:10 am on the morning of 11 September featured a live broadcast of a special Awareness Sunday service at Grosvenor Chapel in London. Nassar preached and Cowart spoke. In addition, a memorial candle was lit by Barbara J. Stephenson, Deputy Chief of Mission at the US Embassy in London.

See also 

 World Communion Sunday

References

External links 
https://web.archive.org/web/20150402110434/http://www.awareness-foundation.co.uk/index.php/awareness-sunday

Christian education
Christian ecumenism